Lineage Wood & Railway Track, Long Melford is a  biological Site of Special Scientific Interest north-east of Long Melford in Suffolk.

Lineage Wood has neutral grassland rides with diverse flora, especially orchids such as the greater butterfly, fly orchid, common spotted and bee orchid. 22 species of butterfly have been recorded. The disused railway line also has floristically rich grassland, but the soil is more alkaline.

Lineage Wood is private land with no public access, but the St Edmund Way footpath runs along the disused railway line.

References

Sites of Special Scientific Interest in Suffolk
Long Melford